James Boyd Longmuir  (26 April 1907 – 22 October 1973) was an eminent Church of Scotland minister in the 20th century.

Early life
Longmuir was born on 26 April 1907. He was educated at Dalziel High School, a secondary school in Motherwell, North Lanarkshire, Scotland. He studied at the University of Glasgow.

Ordained ministry
Longmuir was ordained to Swinton Parish in 1934 where he served until 1952. During World War II, he served with the Royal Army Chaplains' Department and was awarded the Territorial Decoration. After that he was Minister at Chirnside.

He was a member of the Kilbrandon Commission.

He was Dean of the Chapel Royal and Chaplain to HM Bodyguard for Scotland (The Royal Company of Archers) from 1969 to 1973. He was an Honorary Chaplain to the Queen.

He served as Principal Clerk to the General Assembly of the Church of Scotland, and was appointed a Commander of the Order of the British Empire (CBE) in the 1973 New Year Honours.

Longmuir died on 22 October 1973. He was aged 66.

References

1907 births
People educated at Dalziel High School
Alumni of the University of Glasgow
20th-century Ministers of the Church of Scotland
Royal Army Chaplains' Department officers
Honorary Chaplains to the Queen
Moderators of the General Assembly of the Church of Scotland
Deans of the Chapel Royal in Scotland
Commanders of the Order of the British Empire
1973 deaths
Scottish military chaplains
World War II chaplains